No Fire Zone: In the Killing Fields of Sri Lanka is an investigative documentary about the final weeks of the Sri Lankan Civil War. The documentary covers the period from September 2008 until the end of the war in 2009 in which thousands of Tamil people were killed by shelling and extrajudicial executions by the Sri Lankan Army including Balachandran Prabhakaran, the 12-year-old son of the slain Liberation Tigers of Tamil Eelam (LTTE) Chief Velupillai Prabhakaran. The Sri Lankan army has denied the allegations in the documentary. However, on 21 October 2015 the BBC reported that Maxwell Paranagama, a government-appointed Sri Lankan judge, says allegations the army committed war crimes during the long conflict with Tamil Tiger rebels are "credible". He went on to say there was evidence to suggest that footage obtained by the Channel 4 documentary No Fire Zone - showing prisoners naked, blindfolded, with arms tied and shot dead by soldiers - was genuine.

Synopsis

This feature documentary is the product of a three-year investigation and tells the story of the final awful months of the 26-year-long Sri Lankan civil war:
This sometimes harrowing story is told by the people who lived through the war - and through some of the most dramatic and disturbing video evidence ever seen. This footage - direct evidence of war crimes, summary execution, torture and sexual violence - was recorded by
both the victims and perpetrators on mobile phones and small cameras during the final 138 days of hell which form the central narrative of the film.

No Fire Zone is directed by the Nobel Peace Prize nominee Callum Macrae, a Peabody and Colombia Dupont Broadcast Journalism Award winner and Greirson and BAFTA nominee. It has already won many awards and is a nominee for an International Emmy Award 2014.

No Fire Zone has been described as something of an international phenomenon. Not just an agenda setting investigation, but a cinematic tour de force – a stunning and disturbing film in its own right. It was described as "beautifully crafted and heart wrenching” by the Pulitzer Center for Crisis Reporting in Washington, "utterly convincing" by the Globe and Mail in Toronto - and in the UK, Empire noted: "It is vitally important that this feature reaches the widest possible audience”. One critic in Australia described it as “the most devastating film I have seen”, whilst the London Film Review says "No Fire Zone shocks on every level. It shocks, it educates, and it convinces"

It has been widely praised by personalities as disparate as the rapper M.I.A and the British Prime Minister, David Cameron, who said: ”No Fire Zone is one of the most chilling documentaries I’ve watched…”

Film

In March 2013, the documentary was screened by its director, Callum Macrae, at the 22nd session of the United Nations Human Rights Council in Geneva.

The film was not released in theatres in India as Central Board of Film Certification did not approve it. In response to this attempt at censorship No fire Zone was released online for free in India and Malaysia as well as Sri Lanka and Nepal.

In November 2014 the Musician M.I.A described No Fire Zone as “the only film that gives me faith in journalism. It's not only the most important account of what happened to the Tamils, it's actually become part of the fabric of their history."

Awards and Festival Screenings

Festival des Libertes 2013 - Winner of FIDH Best Film Award.
CPH:DOX Copenhagen 2013 - FACT Award Jury Special Mention
Nuremberg Film Festival 2013 - Winner of Audience Award
Film South Asia 2013 - Special Jury Mention.
WatchDocs Poland 2014 - Winner of Audience Award
One World Film Festival Prague 2014 - Winner Václav Havel Jury Special Mention
Docudays UA - Kiev 2014 - Winner of Jury Special Mention.
Festival internacional de Cine y Video de Derochos Humanos Buenos Aires 2013 - Winner Jury Special Mention.
Oslo International film festival 2013.
Movies That Matter 2013
FIFDH Geneva 2013
Tricontinental Human Right Film Festival 2013.
Freedom Film Festival Malaysia 2013
Addis International film Festival 2013.
Sheffield Documentary Festival 2013
No Fire Zone (TV version) was nominated for Best Documentary at the 2014 International Emmy Awards and was awarded the Britdoc Impact Award  as well as being shortlisted for a Grierson award

Controversy

Despite the painstaking checking and independent verification of the footage contained within the film, the Sri Lankan government continue to maintain that the footage contained within the film is faked. However, as more and more evidence continues to emerge this position becomes ever more untenable.

In March 2014 the United Nations Commission on Human Rights voted to establish an independent international inquiry into the events covered in the film and subsequent and ongoing human rights abuses in Sri Lanka. Despite the international mandate for this inquiry the government of  Sri Lanka has refused to cooperate  and has denied the UNCHR investigators entry to Sri Lanka.

The Government of Sri Lanka have also been active in trying to prevent the film being seen. Just prior to No Fire Zone being screened at the Film south Asia festival in Nepal, the Nepalese government were pressurised by the Government of Sri Lanka into trying to have the advertised screening stopped. The organisers of the festival bravely ignored the ban and held two screenings rather than the single advertised screening.

Again in Malaysia, despite the film having already been screened at the Malaysian parliament, a private human rights organisation screening of the film in Kuala Lumpur was raided and the organisers arrested.

Just prior to the Commonwealth Heads of Government meeting held in Colombo in November 2013, a book entitled Corrupted Journalism appeared. This book is published and written by a mysterious group called "Engage Sri Lanka" but is widely believed to be a product of the Sri Lankan government and is widely believed to be an attempt to propagate the Sri Lankan government line that the allegations made in the film and the previous two documentaries shown on UK television by Channel 4 are false. This book was widely distributed and was even included in the delegate pack at the conference until removed at the insistence of the Commonwealth secretariat. Links to the publication also appeared on the Home pages of Sri Lankan Embassy websites around the World.

In response to the allegations made within this book Channel 4 published a detailed rebuttal written by the film's director Callum Macrae entitled The Uncorrupted Truth 

The documentary was banned in India from theatrical release as it would damage ties with Sri Lanka.

Updated Versions 

In November 2014 the producers released an updated version of the film containing new evidence, including footage showing the capture, alive, of the LTTE TV presenter Isaipriya.  Previously the Sri Lankan government had claimed she had died in battle.
This update also included an interview with one of the Tamil doctors who had been trapped in the No Fire Zone.  During the war the doctors told the world of the terrible conditions in the no Fire Zone, but after the war they were arrested and he held by the Sri Lankan Criminal Investigation Department.  While in captivity they were forced to appear at a stage managed government press conference and deny everything they said from the war zone. In this interview - a longer version of which appeared on Channel 4 news in the UK -  the most senior of the doctors revealed that he and the other doctors had been forced by Sri Lankan military intelligence to change their story - and confirmed that what they had said from the war zone was indeed accurate.

In January 2015 it was announced that the producers were working on a Sinhala language version of the film to be released later that month. Also in January 2015, following the defeat of President Rajapaksa in Sri Lanka's presidential election, the film was re-released with a further update in time for a US campus tour organized by the Pulitzer Center on Crisis Reporting starting in February 2015.

References

External links 

No Fire Zone on 4oD

No Fire Zone film trailer

2013 British television series debuts
2013 in Sri Lanka
British television documentaries
Channel 4 original programming
Documentary films alleging war crimes
Documentary films about the Sri Lankan Civil War
British documentary films